HLA-B57 (B57) is an HLA-B serotype. B57 is a split antigen from the B17 broad antigen, the sister serotype B58. The serotype identifies the more common HLA-B*58 gene products. (For terminology help see: HLA-serotype tutorial.) Like B58, B57 is involved in drug-induced inflammatory skin disorders.

Disease
HLA-B*5701 is associated with drug-induced inflammatory disease of the skin. Individuals with B57 are more sensitive to the drug abacavir. Abacavir is an antiretroviral drug used in treatment of HIV, however in sensitive individuals fever, skin rash, fatigue, gastrointestinal symptoms such as nausea, vomiting, diarrhea or abdominal pain and respiratory symptoms such as pharyngitis, dyspnea, or cough can develop.  FDA has advised that people from at-risk ethnic groups, (see table on  the left) be screened prior to drug-therapy.
[Note: phenotype frequencies are roughly double allele frequencies -tabled values- when allele frequency is less than 30%]

The mechanism by which abacavir causes this type 4 hypersensitivity reaction is by binding in the antigen-binding cleft of the HLA-B*57:01 protein, allowing new, "non-self" antigens to bind and be presented to T cells.

Serotype

Allele distribution

References

5
Drug-sensitivity genes